Kanervo is a Finnish surname. Notable people with this surname include:

 Antti Kanervo (born 1989), Finnish basketball player
 Jussi Kanervo (born 1993), Finnish hurdler
 Mimmi Kanervo (1870–1922), Finnish politician and trade unionist
 Ossi Kanervo (born 1987), Finnish ice dancer

See also
 Kanerva